EOU may refer to:

 Eastern Oregon University, in La Grande, Oregon
 Encyclopedia of Ukraine
 Enemy Objectives Unit of the United States Office of Strategic Services during World War II
 Export-Oriented Unit, a type of special economic zone in India; see Domestic tariff area